Villanueva is a Spanish surname. Notable people with the surname include:

 Alejandro Villanueva (1908–1944), Peruvian football (soccer) player
 Alejandro Villanueva (American football) (born 1988), American Football Player for Pittsburgh Steelers
 Alex Villanueva, American law enforcement officer, Los Angeles County sheriff since 2018
 Alex Villanueva (soccer) (born 2002), American soccer player
 Anthony Villanueva (1945–2014), Filipino boxer, represented Philippines in Olympics
 Armando Villanueva (1915–2013), Peruvian politician, full name Armando Villanueva del Campo
 Carlos Villanueva (baseball) (born 1983), Dominican professional baseball player in USA
 Carlos Villanueva (footballer) (born 1986), Chilean football (soccer) player
 Carlos Raúl Villanueva (1900–1975), Venezuelan architect
 Cesar L. Villanueva, Philippine attorney and professor
 Charlie Villanueva (born 1984), Dominican-American basketball player for the NBA
 Christian Villanueva (born 1991), Mexican professional baseball player
 Danny Villanueva (born 1937), American football kicker for the NFL
 Darío Villanueva, Spanish literary critic
 Eddie Villanueva (Eduardo Villanueva, born 1946), religious and political figure in the Philippines
 Eduar Villanueva (born 1984), Venezuelan Olympic middle distance runner
 Edgar David Villanueva, Peruvian congressman
 Enrico Villanueva, Filipino professional basketball player in the Philippines
 Héctor Villanueva (born 1964), Puerto Rican professional baseball player in USA
 José Villanueva, amateur boxer from the Philippines
 Joaquín Lorenzo Villanueva, Spanish priest, historian and writer. 
 José Luis Villanueva (born 1981), Chilean football (soccer) player
 Juan de Villanueva (1739–1811), Spanish neoclassical architect
 Karen Villanueva (born 1998), Mexican rhythmic gymnast
 Mariana Villanueva (born 1964), Mexican composer
 Matthías Villanueva (born 1993), Chilean football (soccer) player
 Nathanael Villanueva (born 1995), Filipino football (soccer) player
 Rafael Villanueva, Dominican classical musician
 Rene Villanueva (born 1954), Filipino author published in the Philippines
 Ron Villanueva (born 1970), American politician serving in the Virginia House of Delegates
 Sal Villanueva, American record producer (1999–2007)
Salvador Villanueva Aguilar , SFC U.S. Army (1942-1965)
Nonito Lacson Villanueva, (1969 - 2016), Filipino Sculptor, Goldsmith, Public Servant (Brgy. Councilor)

Surnames of Filipino origin
Spanish-language surnames